cIAP1 (also named BIRC2) is the abbreviation for a human protein, cellular inhibitor of apoptosis protein-1. It belongs to the IAP family of proteins and therefore contains at least one BIR (baculoviral IAP repeat) domain. 
cIAP1 is a multi-functional protein which can be found in the cytoplasm of cells and in the nucleus of tumor cells. Its function in this particular case is yet to be understood. However, it is well-known that this protein has a big influence in the growth of diverse cancers. cIAP1 is involved in the development process of osteosarcoma and gastric cancer among others.

Location
The cellular localization of cIAP1 is diverse depending on the phase of the living cycle of the cell.  In healthy cells the protein is usually found in the nucleus. This was experimentally determined by immunofluorescence microscopy and subcellular fractionations methods. However, when the cell is apoptotic nuclear export of cIAP1 is induced provoking an increase in the cytosolic concentration of the protein. When a cell is tumorous it does not cease to proliferate inhibiting the apoptosis, as a result, in cancerous cells cIAP1 is rarely located in the cytoplasm.

In case of dividing cells, cIAP1 is released into the cytosol early in mitosis, then reaccumulated in nucleus in late anaphase and in telophase. Nevertheless, there is a pool of cIAP1 associated to the midbody that acts as the exception to the regular rule.

Structure 
The gene of cIAP1 resides on chromosome 11 and its protein has a quaternary structure. It has a unique protein chain, consequently, is an asymmetric monomer protein. Its tertiary structure is basically composed by alpha domain, formed almost exclusively from alpha helix. Its size is of 31,489 bases composed by 618 amino acids and has a molecular mass of 69900 Da. cIAP1 contains baculovirus IAP repeat domains that facilitate binding to caspases and other proteins. cIAP1 is recruited to TNF receptor complexes where they support cell survival through NF-κB activation while suppressing apoptosis by preventing caspase activation.

Function 
cIAP1 is an inhibitor of apoptosis protein. It directly ubiquitinates RIP1 and induces constitutive RIP1 ubiquitination in cancer cells. Ubiquinated RIP1 associates with the prosurvival kinase TAK1. When this complex is desubiquinated apoptosis is induced.

The absence of cIAP1 means that RIP1 will remain nonubiquitinated. As a consequence RIP1 forms a cytosolic complex with the adaptor molecule FADD and caspase 8, which leads to cell death. When cIAP1 ubiquitinates RIP1 this molecule acts as a signal activating the canonical NF-κB signaling pathway. The activation of this pathway stops the noncanonical one and simultaneously the apoptosis.

cIAP1 is important for the activation of MAPK signaling. MAPKs are involved in directing cellular responses to a diverse array os stimuli, such as mitogens, osmotic stress, heat shock and proinflammatory cytokines regulating cell functions including proliferation, gene expression, differentiation, mitosis, cell survival or apoptosis.

cIAP1 is as well implicated in innate immunity. When NOD-like receptors are activated by bacterial peptidoglycans, they oligomerize and recruit cIAP1, cIAP2, TRAF2 and RIP2. This allows cIAP1 mediated ubiquitination of RIP2, which leads to an expression of proinflammatory genes.

Other activities of the cIAP1 have been reported by Yanfei Qi et al. It has got a critical role in controlling β-cell survival under endoplasmatic reticulum (ER) stress. Studies show that when the protein is exposed to palmitate the concentration of cIAP1 decreases and, as a result, the apoptosis is no longer inhibited resulting in the death of the cell. ER stress increases cIAP1 expression in cancer cells through the UPR pathway, that is why, the induction of cIAP1 is suggested to be important for cancerous cell survival under stress conditions.

Related diseases 
Crohn's disease.
cIAP1 is responsible for NOD signalling. When this signalling is defective, Crohn's disease is triggered. The most general symptoms of the disease are diarrhea, rectal bleeding and abdominal cramps and pain among others.

Pancreatic, liver, lung and oseophageal cancer. cIAP1 overexpression is directly related to the proliferation of the previously mentioned types of cancer. Several courses of treatment are focused on the removal of the IAPs to induce cells cytotoxicity.

Hemorrhage and Vascular Regression. cIAP1 has an important role on the maintenance of endothelial cells and blood vessel homeostasis during the development of the vessels. Mutations on the gene that encodes cIAP1 are related to hemorrhage and vascular regression because of the defects it represents on the endothelial cell survival and the modification of apoptosis.

References 

Cancer
Genes on human chromosome 11
Proteins